The 2019 FIBA Under-16 Americas Championship was the men's international basketball competition that was held in Belém, Brazil from 3 to 9 June 2019. The top four teams qualified for the 2020 FIBA Under-17 Basketball World Cup in Bulgaria.

Qualification

Draw
The draw was held on 30 April 2019 in San Juan, Puerto Rico.

Group phase
All times are local (UTC−3).

Group A

Group B

Knockout stage

Bracket

Quarterfinals

5–8th place semifinals

Semifinals

Seventh place game

Fifth place game

Third place game

Final

Final ranking

References

External links
2019 FIBA U16 Americas Championship

FIBA Americas Under-16 Championship
2018–19 in South American basketball
2018–19 in North American basketball
International basketball competitions hosted by Brazil
2018–19 in Brazilian basketball
Youth sport in Brazil
June 2019 sports events in South America